Jan-Henrik Fredriksen (2 October 1956 – 8 March 2020) was a Norwegian politician representing the Progress Party (FRP). He was a representative of Finnmark in the Storting. He was born in Kragerø, Telemark, and was first elected in 2005.

Storting committees
2005–2009 member of the Healthcare committee.

External links

 Fremskrittspartiet - Biography

References

1956 births
2020 deaths
Progress Party (Norway) politicians
Members of the Storting
21st-century Norwegian politicians
People from Kragerø